"Blessed" is a song written by Brett James, Troy Verges, and Hillary Lindsey and recorded by American country music artist Martina McBride.  It was released in October 2001 as the second single from McBride’s Greatest Hits compilation album. In March 2002, it became her fifth and last number one single on the US Billboard Hot Country Singles & Tracks chart.

Content
The narrator talks about how she is “blessed” in many ways.

Music video
The music video was directed by Deaton Flanigen and premiered in late 2001. It is the first of her videos to feature her 2 older daughters, who would later appear in the videos for "This One's For The Girls" and "Teenage Daughters". The video also features her husband John, and although set in a forest, it was actually filmed on a soundstage in Nashville.

Personnel
Compiled from liner notes.

 Matt Chamberlain — drums
 David Huff — programming
 Carolyn Dawn Johnson — background vocals
 Troy Lancaster — electric guitar
 B. James Lowry — acoustic guitar
 Martina McBride — lead and background vocals
 Jerry McPherson — electric guitar
 Steve Nathan — Hammond B-3 organ
 Biff Watson — acoustic guitar
 Glenn Worf — bass guitar
 Jonathan Yudkin — violin, viola, cello

Chart performance
"Blessed" debuted at No. 56 on the U.S. Billboard Hot Country Singles & Tracks for the week of November 3, 2001.

Year-end charts

References

2001 singles
Martina McBride songs
Songs written by Brett James
Songs written by Hillary Lindsey
Songs written by Troy Verges
Song recordings produced by Paul Worley
RCA Records Nashville singles
Music videos directed by Deaton-Flanigen Productions
2001 songs